Nellis is an unincorporated community coal town in Boone County, West Virginia, United States on Brush Creek. The Nellis Historic District was listed on the National Register of Historic Places in 2000.  Nellis was named by mine owners Matthew Slush and T.E.B. Siler after Frank E. Nellis, editor of the "Mount Clemens Independent" in Michigan.

References

Unincorporated communities in Boone County, West Virginia
Coal towns in West Virginia